Elias A. "Eli" Ashurst (28 December 1901 – 7 December 1927) was an English professional footballer born in Willington, County Durham, who played as a fullback. He made 66 appearances in the First Division of the Football League for Birmingham in the 1920s.

Ashurst spent four seasons with Birmingham, retiring through poor health at the end of the 1925–26 season, and died in his native Willington the following year, aged only 25. His brother Bill was also a professional footballer who played for Notts County (among others) and for England.

References

1901 births
1927 deaths
People from Willington, County Durham
Footballers from County Durham
English footballers
Association football fullbacks
Willington A.F.C. players
Ashington A.F.C. players
Shildon A.F.C. players
Stanley United F.C. players
Birmingham City F.C. players
English Football League players